Rajesh Tripura is an Indian politician and elected member of the Tripura Tribal Areas Autonomous District Council (TTAADC). Rajesh was elected from the Raima Valley constituency in Dhalai district.

References 

Tripura politicians
People from North Tripura district
Tripuri people
Living people
Year of birth missing (living people)